Cochetopa Creek is a stream in Saguache and Gunnison counties in Colorado, United States. It rises on San Luis Peak in the La Garita Mountains. It merges with Tomichi Creek near the town of Parlin, Colorado, along Highway 50.

The creek flows through the Cochetopa Caldera in the San Juan volcanic field and through Cochetopa Canyon along Colorado State Highway 114.

See also
List of rivers of Colorado
List of tributaries of the Colorado River

References

Rivers of Colorado
Rivers of Gunnison County, Colorado
Rivers of Saguache County, Colorado
Tributaries of the Colorado River in Colorado